is a Japanese manga series written and illustrated by Masakazu Ooi. It was serialized in Shueisha's seinen manga magazine Grand Jump from August 2015 to January 2018, with an epilogue chapter published in Grand Jump Premium.

Publication
Written and illustrated by Masakazu Ooi, Ashitaba-san Chi no Muko Kurashi was serialized in Shueisha's seinen manga magazine Grand Jump from August 5, 2015, to January 4, 2018. An epilogue chapter was published in Grand Jump Premium on February 27, 2018. Shueisha collected its chapters in seven tankōbon volumes, released from January 19, 2016, to April 19, 2018.

Volume list

See also
Oku-san, another manga series by the same author

References

External links
 

Comedy anime and manga
Marriage in anime and manga
Seinen manga
Shueisha manga